Ixiamas is a town and municipality in the La Paz Department, Bolivia.

It is served by Ixiamas Airport.

Climate 

Ixiamas has a tropical rainforest climate, sitting on the southern edge of the Amazon forest in western Bolivia. Ixiamas receives ample rainfall throughout the year and is generally hot year round, with slightly milder winter temperatures.

References 

 Instituto Nacional de Estadística de Bolivia

Populated places in La Paz Department (Bolivia)
Archaeological sites in Bolivia
Andean civilizations